Jadick is a surname. Notable people with the surname include:

 Johnny Jadick (1908–1970), American boxer
 Richard Jadick, American naval surgeon, recipient of a Bronze Star

See also
 Janick